Richey Reneberg was the defending champion, but lost in the first round this year.

Richard Krajicek won the tournament, beating Guillaume Raoux in the final, 6–4, 7–6(9–7).

Seeds

Draw

Finals

Top half

Bottom half

References

 Main Draw

Rosmalen Grass Court Championships
1997 ATP Tour